Durham East was a federal electoral district represented in the House of Commons of Canada from 1867 to 1904. It was located in the province of Ontario. It was created by the British North America Act of 1867 which divided the county of Durham into two ridings: Durham West and Durham East.

The East Riding of Durham was abolished in 1903 when it was merged into Durham riding.

Election results

|}

|}

|}

|}

|}

On Mr. Williams' death, 4 July 1885:

|}

|}

 
|Equal Rights
|GRANDY, Samuel       
|align="right"| 1,685    
|}

|}

See also 

 List of Canadian federal electoral districts
 Past Canadian electoral districts

External links 
Riding history from the Library of Parliament

Former federal electoral districts of Ontario